The men's quadrant regu sepak takraw competition at the 2018 Asian Games was held at Ranau Sports Hall, Palembang, Indonesia from 28 August to 1 September 2018. This was held for the first time in the Asian Games history.

Squads

Results
All times are Western Indonesia Time (UTC+07:00)

Preliminary

Group A

|-
|28 August||15:30
|align=right|
|align=center|0–2
|align=left|
|18–21||17–21||
|-
|28 August||15:30
|align=right|
|align=center|2–0
|align=left|
|21–15||21–12||
|-
|29 August||12:30
|align=right|
|align=center|1–2
|align=left|
|18–21||21–12||21–23
|-
|29 August||12:30
|align=right|
|align=center|2–0
|align=left|
|21–13||21–7||
|-
|30 August||10:00
|align=right|
|align=center|1–2
|align=left|
|16–21||21–12||18–21
|-
|30 August||10:00
|align=right|
|align=center|0–2
|align=left|
|18–21||14–21||
|-
|30 August||14:00
|align=right|
|align=center|2–0
|align=left|
|21–16||21–13||
|-
|30 August||14:00
|align=right|
|align=center|2–0
|align=left|
|21–19||21–12||
|-
|31 August||10:00
|align=right|
|align=center|0–2
|align=left|
|9–21||12–21||
|-
|31 August||10:00
|align=right|
|align=center|2–0
|align=left|
|21–14||23–21||
|-

Group B

|-
|28 August||16:30
|align=right|
|align=center|0–2
|align=left|
|4–21||3–21||
|-
|28 August||16:30
|align=right|
|align=center|2–0
|align=left|
|21–8||21–4||
|-
|29 August||13:30
|align=right|
|align=center|2–0
|align=left|
|21–4||21–2||
|-
|29 August||13:30
|align=right|
|align=center|2–0
|align=left|
|21–8||21–7||
|-
|30 August||11:00
|align=right|
|align=center|2–0
|align=left|
|21–16||21–8||
|-
|30 August||11:00
|align=right|
|align=center|0–2
|align=left|
|16–21||24–25||
|-
|30 August||15:00
|align=right|
|align=center|0–2
|align=left|
|11–21||7–21||
|-
|30 August||15:00
|align=right|
|align=center|1–2
|align=left|
|21–19||17–21||15–21
|-
|31 August||11:00
|align=right|
|align=center|2–0
|align=left|
|21–5||21–2||
|-
|31 August||11:00
|align=right|
|align=center|2–0
|align=left|
|21–19||21–16||
|-

Knockout round

Semifinals

|-
|31 August||15:30
|align=right|
|align=center|2–0
|align=left|
|21–8||21–12||
|-
|31 August||15:30
|align=right|
|align=center|0–2
|align=left|
|17–21||15–21||
|-

Gold medal match

|-
|1 September||12:30
|align=right|
|align=center|2–1
|align=left|
|15–21||21–14||21–16
|-

References

External links
Sepak takraw at the 2018 Asian Games

Sepak takraw at the 2018 Asian Games